German rapper Capital Bra has recorded material for his six studio albums, four extended plays and has collaborated with other artists for duets and featured songs on their respective albums. Following his departure from the German rap battle tournament Rap am Mittwoch in February 2015, Capital Bra started working on his debut studio album Kuku Bra (2016). All sixteen tracks of the record were written by him, alongside MMinx, Produes and produced solely the Hijackers.

Ten songs on his second studio album Makarov Komplex (2017), were produced by German producer Saven Musiq. His first extended play Ibrakadabra, was released alongside the before mentioned album and was completely written by him and again produced by Saven Musiq. Furthermore, he produced seven songs, including two singles, of Capital Bra's third studio album Blyat (2017). David Kraft and Tim Wilke, known as The Cratez began producing for him on this record and produced nine of the tracks, including one single. His fourth studio album Berlin lebt was released nine months later in June 2018 and was entirely produced by The Cratez, with Freek Van Workum co-producing on "Darby" and Young Taylor on "Neymar". The simultaneously released 5 Songs in einer Nacht EP, was completely produced by The Cratez. The follow-up Allein, released in November 2018 was mostly produced by Beatzarre and Djorkaeff, who are credited on seven songs, including two singles.

Songs

Notes

References

Capital Bra